Ballochmyle  is one of the nine electoral wards of East Ayrshire Council. Created in 2007, the ward elects four councillors using the single transferable vote electoral system and covers an area with a population of 13,990 people.

The area was previously a Labour stronghold with the party winning three of the four seats at the first election in 2007. However, the ward has since move towards the Scottish National Party (SNP) with the party holding half the seats since 2012.

Boundaries
The ward was created following the Fourth Statutory Reviews of Electoral Arrangements ahead of the 2007 Scottish local elections. As a result of the Local Governance (Scotland) Act 2004, local elections in Scotland would use the single transferable vote electoral system from 2007 onwards so Ballochmyle was formed from an amalgamation of several previous first-past-the-post wards. It contained part of the former Galston East, Mauchline, Catrine, Sorn and Mauchline East and Auchinleck wards as well as all of the former Muirkirk, Lugar and Logan ward. Ballochmyle runs across the council area from its border with South Ayrshire to the easternmost part of the council area between its borders with South Lanarkshire and Dumfries and Galloway and takes in the towns of Mauchline, Catrine, Auchinleck, Sorn and Muirkirk. Following the Fifth Statutory Reviews of Electoral Arrangements ahead of the 2017 Scottish local elections, the ward's northwestern boundary was extended north and west to run along the A77.

Councillors

Election results

2022 election

2017 election

2012 election

2008 by-election

2007 election

References

Wards of East Ayrshire
Auchinleck
Mauchline